Dragster may refer to:

Dragster (car), a drag racing term referring to a lengthy, open-wheeled vehicle
Dragster (video game), a video game released in 1980
Top Thrill Dragster, a roller coaster at Cedar Point that is commonly called the Dragster
Dragster, another name for a wheelie bike